The Knife of Don Juan or The Blade of Don Juan (Spanish: La navaja de Don Juan) is a 2013 Peruvian-American comedy-drama film written, directed and co-produced by Tom Sanchez in his directorial debut. Starring JC Montoya and Rodrigo Viaggio.

Synopsis 
The relationship of two brothers will be defined by a game of forces and a party where the youngest of them hopes to lose his virginity. But as events unfold, the boys must overcome rivalries that, after a fight, suddenly send things spiraling out of control.

Cast 
The actors participating in this film are:

 JC Montoya as Walter Alfaro
 Rodrigo Viaggio as Mario Alfaro
 Irma Maury as Grandma
 Antonio Arrué as Uncle umberto
 Viviana Andrade as Jenni Alfaro
 Jorge Gutiérrez as Crazy Face
 Nataniel Sánchez as Ana
 Fernando Petong as Juan Carlos Alfaro
 Jimena Venturo as Vanesa
 Deyssi Pelaez as Carmen Rosa
 Sebastian Rubio as Guillermo
 Jaime Calle as Upset Player

Production

Financing 
In 2012, it won the Post-Production Feature Film Project Contest where he received S/.210,000 to complete the post-production stage.

Filming 
The film was recorded in different locations in Lima such as Rímac and Quinta Heeren in Barrios Altos.

Release 
The film initially premiered in November 2013 at the Austin, Texas Film Festival. The film was commercially released on September 24, 2015, in Peruvian theaters.

Reception 
The film managed to attract 4,224 viewers throughout its run in theaters.

References

External links 

 

2013 films
2013 comedy-drama films
Peruvian comedy-drama films
American comedy-drama films
2010s Spanish-language films
2010s Peruvian films
Films set in Peru
2010s American films
Films shot in Peru
Films about teenagers
Films about brothers
Films about virginity
2013 directorial debut films